San Fernando City, officially the City of San Fernando, is a 3rd class component city and capital of the province of La Union, Philippines. According to the 2020 census, it has a population of 125,640 people.

City of San Fernando, La Union serves as a gateway to trade, commerce, culture and heritage of Ilocandia. It is the financial, industrial, and political center of the province, as well as the regional capital of Region 1 (Ilocos Region), hosting regional offices of national government agencies as well as being home to some of the region's educational and medical institutions and facilities. The city is located in the geographical center of the Province of La Union.

History

Colonial History 

San Fernando, along with all the southern coastal towns of La Union were once called Agoo in pre-colonial times. Agoo was the northern part of Caboloan (Pangasinan), covering a large area that encompassed the towns of “Atuley” (San Juan), San Fernando, Bauang, Caba, “Alingay or Alinguey” (Aringay), Santo Tomas and Rosario.

When Juan de Salcedo a Spanish, explored the area in June 1572, he and his men were involved in a skirmish with 3 Japanese ships. He discovered that there was a settlement in the area, occupied by Japanese and Chinese merchants. The incident earned Agoo the name “El Puerto de Japon,” the Japanese Port. Agoo was heavily involved in trade with other neighboring Southeast Asian countries. Agoo's role as an ancient port eventually deteriorated when the Spanish closed the Philippines to foreign trade.

The origins of the capital city of the province of La Union date back to the formal creation of the municipality or Ministerio de San Fernando which coincided with the founding of the Parish of San Fernando, Augustinian friar Jose Torres on May 6, 1786, in honor of King Ferdinand of Spain. San Fernando was formerly called “Pindangan” from the word “pindang” which was a traditional method of drying fish. Pindangan was formed in 1759 from the union of two sitios - “San Vicente de Balanac” and “San Guilermo de Dalangdang” - for mutual protection against marauding pirates from the sea and headhunters from the mountains. Augustinian friar Jose Torres also had the Pindangan church built but a massive earthquake in the 1760s left the church in total ruin - except for the massive buttresses that still stand today, known as the Pindangan Ruins.

Named after Saint Ferdinand III of Castile, San Fernando was founded in 1786. That same year, instead of rebuilding the Pindangan church, the Franciscans decided to build a new one in honor of San Guillermo. This is now the Cathedral of St. William the Hermit situated at the center of San Fernando City.

On October 29, 1849, Governor General Narciso Zaldua Claveria issued a “promovido” combining the eight northern towns of Pangasinan, three southern towns of Ilocos Sur due south of the Amburayan River, and 8 western settlements of Benguet or Eastern Pais del Igorotes in the Cordilleras into the province La Union. On March 2, 1850, Governor General Antonio Maria Blanco signed the “Superior Decreto” of La Union, with San Fernando as the “cabecera,” the capital, and with Captain Toribio Ruiz de la Escalera as the first Gobernador Militar y Politico. Its creation as a province was formally approved by a Royal Decree issued by Queen Isabela II of Spain on April 18, 1854. 

From 1896 until 1898, during the Philippine Revolution, the Spanish garrison of San Fernando was attacked by Filipino revolutionaries under Manuel Tinio y Bundoc and Mauro Ortiz. Spanish administration ceased; a short while later, The Spanish ceded the country to the Americans in the 1890s. The United States acquired control over the country by the Treaty of Paris following the events of the Spanish–American War.

From its inception as the capital of La Union up to the Second World War, San Fernando experienced monumental transformations in the socio-cultural and politico-economic aspects. After World War II, rehabilitation and reconstruction were done, eventually propelling the city as the center of commerce and trade and the administrative center of Region I.

World War II 
In the Second World War, the last battle of San Fernando was fought during the Japanese occupation at Barangay Bacsil. The Bacsil Ridge Monument was built on the site in the city, the north-eastern portion of the town plaza. The victory enabled the establishment of the United States Army Base, Base M at Poro Point (a buildup area for the Japan invasion) and an US Navy Base. The town was liberated in 1945.

The Battle of Bacsil Ridge

The Battle of Bacsil Ridge was fought in March 1945 was one of the continued main battles of the Philippines Campaign of the Second World War are between the Filipino soldiers under the 121st Infantry Regiment, Philippine Commonwealth Army, USAFIP-NL, under the command of Russell W. Volckmann, and the Japanese Imperial forces under by General Tomoyuki Yamashita.

The Battle of Bacsil Ridge ended the month-long battle for control of San Fernando. The Japanese defenders called the Hayashi Detachment, composed of 3,000 armed troops and 2,000 unarmed support forces, took hold of San Fernando and its surrounding areas which denied entry to the port of the city and a road leading to Baguio. As part of the San Fernando-Bacsil Operations, the 1st Battalion of 121st Infantry were sent to loosen the enemy positions starting late February with the assistance of the Allied Air Force.

The 1st Battalion made a general attack to the ridge on March 16, 1945, and fought the Japanese defenders until the capture of Bacsil on March 19. On the same day, the 3rd battalion captured Reservoir Hill. The Battle of Bacsil Ridge between the Filipino guerrillas and the Japanese Forces resulted in the recapture of the city of San Fernando, La Union. which resulted in the capture of San Fernando, La Union on March 23, 1945, and Bacnotan, La Union and the military offensive throughout the province ended on March 24 after two months of fighting.

Martial law era 
Although Ilocanos are perceived to have been largely silent about the authoritarian practices,  there were still San Fernando residents willing to express their objections to the Marcos administration. This included San-Fernando-raised student activists Romulo and Armando Palabay, UP Students and La Union National High School alumni who were imprisoned for their protest activities in San Fernando, tortured at Camp Olivas in Pampanga, and later separately killed before the end of Martial Law.  The respective martyrdoms of Romulo (age 22) and Armando (age 21) were later honored when their names were etched on the Wall of Remembrance at the Philippines’ Bantayog ng mga Bayani, which honors the heroes and martyrs who fought the authoritarian regime.

Cityhood 

San Fernando became a city by virtue of Republic Act No. 8509 signed into law on February 13, 1998, and ratified on March 20, 1998, by a plebiscite.

Geography
The city is bounded by San Juan to the north, Bauang to the south, Bagulin and Naguilian to the east, and the South China Sea to the west.

Barangays
San Fernando is politically subdivided into 59 barangays. These barangays are headed by elected officials: Barangay Captain, Barangay Council, whose members are called Barangay Councilors. All are elected every three years.

 Abut
 Apaleng
 Bacsil
 Bangbangolan
 Bangcusay
 Barangay I (Poblacion)
 Barangay II (Poblacion)
 Barangay III (Poblacion)
 Barangay IV (Poblacion)
 Baraoas
 Bato
 Biday
 Birunget
 Bungro
 Cabaroan (Negro)
 Cabarsican
 Cadaclan
 Calabugao
 Camansi
 Canaoay
 Carlatan
 Catbangen
 Dallangayan Este
 Dallangayan Oeste
 Dalumpinas Este
 Dalumpinas Oeste
 Ilocanos Norte
 Ilocanos Sur
 Langcuas
 Lingsat
 Madayegdeg
 Mameltac
 Masicong
 Nagyubuyuban
 Namtutan
 Narra Este
 Narra Oeste
 Pacpaco
 Pagdalagan
 Pagdaraoan
 Pagudpud
 Pao Norte
 Pao Sur
 Parian
 Pias
 Poro
 Puspus
 Sacyud
 Sagayad
 San Agustin
 San Francisco
 San Vicente
 Santiago Norte
 Santiago Sur
 Saoay
 Sevilla
 Siboan-Otong
 Tanqui
 Tanquigan

Climate

Demographics

Economy 

San Fernando is mainly agricultural (rice, legumes, leafy vegetables, root crops, fruit trees, corn, and tobacco). But residents treat fishing in coastline and seashore areas as secondary means of livelihood. The natives also have inabel hand-woven cloth, baskets, shell crafts, including foods, such as kilawen and papaitan, basi, sukang Iloko  and paslubong such as guapples, longganiza, honey and native rice cakes, puto, suman, and bibingka.

“Patupat” is an Ilocano San Fernando's native delicacy, made from "agdapil" (sugarcane, a tall tropical Southeast Asian Grass (Saccharum officinarum).

San Fernando has many class A hotels and resorts and night clubs such as Aureo La Union Thunderbird Resorts and Casinos Poro Point

Government
San Fernando, belonging to the first congressional district of the province of La Union, is governed by a mayor designated as its local chief executive and by a city council as its legislative body in accordance with the Local Government Code. The mayor, vice mayor, and the councilors are elected directly by the people through an election which is being held every three years.

The mayor and other elected officers hold office at the city hall of San Fernando. The city council, the Sangguniang Panlungsod, is housed in the Don Mariano Marcos Building beside the city hall.

Elected officials

List of chief executives

 1895–1898 — Paulino Alviar
 1899–1901 — Blas Tadiar
 1901–1903 — Urbano Martínez
 1904–1905 — Edilberto Aquino
 1906–1907 — Francisco Z. Flores
 1908–1909 — Angel Salanga
 1910–1911 — José Hidalgo
 1912–1914 — Anastacio Casuga
 1915–1918 — Juan Salanga
 1919–1921 — Ulpiano Flores
 1922–1928 — Pedro R. Flores
 1928      — Francisco Galvez
 1928–1930 — Evaristo Galvez
 1931–1933 — Gaspar Flores
 1934–1936 — Lauro Casuga
 1936–1939 — Paulino Flores
 1942–1944 — Juan Salanga
 1945–1946 — Modesto Aquino
 1946–1955 — Lorenzo L. Dacanay
 1956–1959 — Godofredo G. Rilloraza
 1960–1971 — Lorenzo L. Dacanay
 1972–1980 — Antonio Feraren
 1980      — Joaquin T. Ortega
 1980–1987 — Justo O. Orros Jr.
 1987      — Rufo T. Colisao
 1987–1988 — Angel Salanga
 1988–1998 — Manuel C. Ortega
 1998–2007 — Mary Jane C. Ortega
 2007–2016 — Pablo C. Ortega
 2016–Present — Hermenegildo A. Gualberto

Annual community events

The city has a yearly fiesta, celebrated from January 28 to February 15, where a trade fair is opened near the city hall.

Celebrations are also done around March, in celebration of Cityhood.

The following events happen annually: Annual City Fiesta, February 10; Bacsil Ridge Celebration, March 19; Pindangan Festival, March 20; Ma-tzu Festival, September 16.

Tourism
 Poro Point
 Poro Point Special Economic and Freeport Zone  (formerly American Military Base – Wallace Air Station)
 Thunderbird Resorts
 Boardwalk
 The La Union Botanical Garden (8 kilometers from the city) – is a 10 hectare garden (Barangay Cadaclan), the home of various species of rare plants and a sanctuary of wild animals.
 Battle of Bacsil Ridge Marker
 Pindangan Ruins (Barangay Parian)
 Hobbitat Forest Park
 Poro Point Baywalk (Barangay Poro)
 Seven Hills 
 Capitol Hill (Barangay II) home of the Provincial Capitol 
 Pagoda Hill also known as Filipino-Chinese Friendship Park or Chinese Pagoda (Barangay II)
 Heroes’ Hill & Freedom Park Stairway (153 steps) located at the eastern portion of Capitol Hill
 Bethany Hill (Barangay II)
 Mirador Hill (Barangay II)
 Mariner's Hill (Barangay Catbangen)
 Miracle Hill  (Barangay Pagdaraoan)
 Christ the Redeemer (25-foot statue, Reservoir Hill, Barangay I)
 Poro Point Lighthouse
 Moro Watch Tower (Barangay Carlatan)
 La Union Science Centrum & Museum (LUSCM has 5 Galleries: Kadaklan Burial Site and Environmental Gallery, Museum, Dark Room, Main Science Gallery and Portable Planetarium (Barangay Cadaclan)
 Ma-Cho Temple
 Tomb of Unknown Soldier (Barangay Madayegdeg)
 Cathedral of St. William the Hermit (Barangay II, Poblacion)
 Kasay Marine Sanctuary: 30 hectares MPA, featuring the 50 years old Giant clam or Tridacna gigas (Barangay Canaoay)
 Children's Park (Barangay II, City Plaza)
 10.6 hectares Engineered Sanitary Landfill (Barangay Mameltac)
 La Union Trade Center (beside the City Hall)

Notable personalities
Armando Palabay - Human rights activist and martyr honored at the Bantayog ng mga Bayani
Ashley Ortega Ashleigh Marguerretthe Krystalle Nordstrom Samson, known as Ashley Ortega (born December 26, 1998), is a Filipino-German actress well known for her roles in Dormitoryo and My Destiny on GMA Network. She is formerly a co-host of the variety show Wowowin.
Roger Casugay – Filipino surfer and National Hero. 
Lucrecia Kasilag — Composer, Dean of the Philippine Women's University College of Music and Fine Arts (1953-1977), President of the Cultural Center of the Philippines (1976-1986) Awardee of the Order of National Artists of the Philippines
Jessica Soho - Multi-awarded broadcaster journalist; narrator and magazine TV host

Sister cities
  Ansan, South Korea
  Coatzacoalcos, Mexico
  Naga, Camarines Sur
  Valenzuela City

References

External links

 
 R.A. 8508 – "Charter of the City of San Fernando."
 [ Philippine Standard Geographic Code]
 Philippine Census Information
 Local Governance Performance Management System

 
Populated places in La Union
Cities in the Ilocos Region
Provincial capitals of the Philippines
Populated places established in 1850
1850 establishments in the Philippines
Port cities and towns in the Philippines
Component cities in the Philippines